Temptation Island is an American reality dating show, in which several couples agree to live with a group of singles of the opposite sex, in order to test the strength of their relationships. It is based on the Dutch TV-program Blind Vertrouwen (translated as Blind Faith) created by Endemol and has been adapted in various countries.

The series originally premiered on Fox. In 2019, Temptation Island was revived by USA Network.

History
The first season of the show was filmed on Ambergris Caye in Belize. Season 1 premiered on January 10, 2001 and aired its finale on February 28, 2001. The debut episode drew 16 million viewers. The show attracted controversy from the outset, which Fox hoped would drive ratings. Four male contestants lived in one section with a dozen female models, and the four female contestants lived in another section with a dozen attractive men. The initial couples were Kaya Wittenburg and Valerie Penso, Mandy Lauderdale and Billy Cleary, Ytossie Patterson and Taheed Watson, and Andy Lukei and Shannon Roghair. Patterson and Watson were removed from the show when the producers learned that the pair had children together. The remaining three couples continued.

Season 2 premiered on October 31, 2001 and delivered poor ratings. After a nearly two-year layoff, a third edition of the series premiered on August 28, 2003. Like Season 2, Season 3 also delivered poor ratings.

Mark L. Walberg hosted all three editions. Reruns once aired on Hulu, but are no longer available there.

A revamped version of the show, once again hosted by Walberg, premiered on the USA Network on January 15, 2019. USA Network announced the show was renewed for a fifth season on February 26, 2019. On August 22, 2019, it was announced that the fifth season would premiere on October 10, 2019.

On January 28, 2021, it was announced that the sixth season would premiere on February 16, 2021.

Series Overview

Couples

Season 1

Season 2

Season 3

Season 4

Season 5

Season 6

Season 7

International versions

See also
Love Island (original celebrity version)
Love Island
Paradise Hotel
Forever Eden
Love in the Wild
Trash culture

References

External links
Season 1 site
Season 2 site
Season 3 site

Fox Broadcasting Company original programming
USA Network original programming
2001 American television series debuts
2003 American television series endings
2019 American television series debuts
American dating and relationship reality television series
2000s American reality television series
2010s American reality television series
Television series by 20th Century Fox Television
Television series by Banijay
Television series by Rocket Science Laboratories
American television series revived after cancellation
Television shows filmed in Belize
Television shows filmed in Honduras
Television shows filmed in Hawaii